NGC 585 is a spiral galaxy in the constellation of Cetus, which is about 245 million light-years from the Milky Way's center. The object was discovered on December 20, 1827 by the British astronomer John Frederick William Herschel.

See also 
 List of NGC objects (1–1000)

References

External links
 

Spiral galaxies
585
Cetus (constellation)
005688